Qianshanornis rapax is an extinct predatory bird from the Middle Paleocene of China. Q. rapax is the first (chronologically and otherwise) cariamiform bird to have been found in Asia. It is very similar to the Eocene Strigogyps, but it differs in being smaller, and in having a hypertrophied, hyperextensible second toe, forming a claw analogous to that of dromeosaur dinosaurs.  This toe is thought to allowed the bird to better pin down captured prey.  Although very little wing-material is known, the condylar processes suggest it was capable of flight, and probably was a flier superior to either Strigogyps or modern seriemas.

References

Bird genera
Fossil taxa described in 2013
Paleocene birds
Paleogene birds of Asia
Prehistoric animals of China